The 2006 Angola Basketball Super Cup (13th edition) was contested by Primeiro de Agosto, as the 2005 league champion and Petro Atlético, the 2005 cup runner-up. Petro Atlético was the winner, making it its 5th title.

The 2006 Women's Super Cup (11th edition) was contested by Primeiro de Agosto, as the 2005 women's league champion and Desportivo do Maculusso, the 2005 Women's cup runner-up. Primeiro de Agosto was the winner.

2006 Men's Super Cup

2006 Women's Super Cup

See also
 2006 Angola Basketball Cup
 2006 BAI Basket

References

Angola Basketball Super Cup seasons
Super Cup